Stefan Lochbihler (born 1 October 1965) is a former professional tennis player from Austria.

Biography
A right-handed player from Tyrol, Lochbihler reached a career best ranking of 141 in the world. He had his best year on tour in 1989 when he won a Sao Paulo Challenger event and featured in the main draw of seven Grand Prix tournaments. At the Campionati Internazionali di Sicilia that year he won a match against former world number 21 Francesco Cancellotti.

Lochbihler has been the personal coach of Stephanie Vogt and in 2012 was appointed as the national coach of Liechtenstein.

Challenger titles

Singles: (1)

References

External links
 
 

1965 births
Living people
Austrian male tennis players
Austrian tennis coaches
Austrian expatriate sportspeople  in Liechtenstein
Sportspeople from Innsbruck